Mabadin-e Sofla (also Romanized as Mabādīn-e Soflá) is a village in Arabkhaneh Rural District, Shusef District, Nehbandan County, South Khorasan Province, Iran. At the 2006 census, its population was 38, in 12 families.

References 

Populated places in Nehbandan County